Senator Barry may refer to:

Alexander G. Barry (1892–1952), U.S. Senator from Oregon from 1938 to 1939
Anthony Barry (1901–1983), Senate of Ireland
Frederick G. Barry (1845–1909), Mississippi State Senate
Henry W. Barry (1840–1875), Mississippi State Senate
John S. Barry (1802–1870), Michigan State Senate
Norman Barry (1897–1988), Illinois State Senate
Warren E. Barry (1933–2016), Virginia State Senate
William T. Barry (1784–1835), Kentucky State Senate